Arthur Alfred Hermann (16 October 1893 in Mulhouse – 28 March 1958 in Belfort) was a French gymnast who competed in the 1920 Summer Olympics and in the 1924 Summer Olympics.

References

1893 births
1958 deaths
French male artistic gymnasts
Olympic gymnasts of France
Gymnasts at the 1920 Summer Olympics
Gymnasts at the 1924 Summer Olympics
Olympic silver medalists for France
Olympic bronze medalists for France
Olympic medalists in gymnastics
Sportspeople from Mulhouse
Medalists at the 1924 Summer Olympics
Medalists at the 1920 Summer Olympics
20th-century French people